Laurier Station or station Laurier may refer to:

 Laurier-Station, Quebec, a village in Quebec, in MRC Lotbinière
 Laurier train station, see Laurier-Station, Quebec
 Laurier station (Montreal Metro), a station on the Orange line of the Montreal Metro
 Laurier station (OC Transpo), an Ottawa Bus Rapid Transit station
 Laurier station (Manitoba), a Via Rail station

See also
 Laurier (disambiguation)